Zappella is an Italian surname. Notable people with the surname include:

Davide Zappella (born 1998), Italian footballer
Giuseppe Zappella (born 1973), Italian footballer
Michele Zappella (born 1936), Italian psychiatrist and scholar

Italian-language surnames